Pelatantheria eakroensis is a species of epiphytic or lithophytic orchid occurring in Vietnam. The plants are endemic to southern Vietnam.

Ecology
They are found under dry conditions in southern Vietnamese dry lowland Dipterocarp forests and have obvious xeromorphic features. This species is very rare, and considered endangered. It is found on silicate and thus commonly acidic basement rock at elevations of 0 to 800 m a.s.l on other plants. Lithophytic growth has not been reported.

Conservation
This species is protected under the Convention on International Trade in Endangered Species of Wild Fauna and Flora CITES and thus is regarded as potentially endangered.

References

eakroensis
Orchids of Vietnam